The Real Blac Chyna is a reality television series starring Blac Chyna. It premiered on July 14, 2019, on Zeus Network. The show ended on October 6, 2019.

Development
On May 15, 2019, it was reported that Blac Chyna had signed a deal with Zeus Network to star and produce her own docu-series. The show made headlines while filming when Chyna's ex-partner Rob Kardashian refused to allow their daughter Dream to appear on the show, as well as for the intense fight between Chyna and her mother Tokyo Toni in the show's premiere episode. On September 1, 2019, Zeus released the first episode for free on YouTube, garnering over 6 million views. On October 8, 2019, Zeus released the second episode for free on YouTube, garnering over 6 million views.
The show later began airing on January 7, 2021 on We TV.

Series synopsis

Overview and casting
The Real Blac Chyna chronicles the everyday life and struggles of entrepreneur Blac Chyna.

Several members of Chyna's inner circle appear as supporting cast members in confessional interview segments throughout the series. They include her best friend Treasure Gemz, her assistant Ashton Levi, her mother Tokyo Toni, her manager Jamaal Terrance and her hair stylist Alex Jairus. During the season, Treasure, Ashton and Jamaal are phased out of the series, after each having a falling out with Chyna.

On November 2, 2019, Chyna confirmed that a second season was in the works.

Episodes

References

External links
 

2010s American reality television series
2019 American television series debuts
Cultural depictions of socialites
English-language television shows
Television shows set in Los Angeles